Linz-East Airport is a private use airport located  east-southeast of Linz, Oberösterreich, Austria.

See also
List of airports in Austria

References

External links 
 Airport record for Linz-East Airport at Landings.com

Airports in Austria
Upper Austria